Sombetini (Kata ya Sombetini, in Swahili) is one of the 19 administrative wards of the Arusha City Council located in the Arusha Region of Tanzania. The ward is bordered by Elerai ward to the north, Unga Limited and Sokon I wards to the east. The wards of Olasiti and Terrat are located in to west and south respectively.

Geography

Economy 
The southern part of Sombetini ward is home to the Arusha City Goat Market,  the largest goat market in Arusha Region. Other notable economic activities are the Mbauda Market, also one of the largest trading centers in the city. Additionally, the ward is home to the Arusha Cultural Heritage Center and Gallery. Morombo goat barbeque street is one of the top attractions in the ward.

Administration
The postal code for Sombetini Ward is 23116. 
The ward is divided into the following neighbourhoods: 
 Kirika A, Sombetini
 Kirika B, Sombetini
 Olamuriaki, Sombetini
 Osunyai, Sombetini
 Simanjiro, Sombetini

Education and health

Education
Sombetini ward is home to these educational institutions: 
 Sombetini Primary School
 Sombetini Secondary School
 Imani Primary School (private)
 Green Valley School (private)
 Hady Primary School (private)
 Nakido Primary School (private)

Healthcare
Sombetini ward is home to the following health institutions:
 Sombetini Health Center

References

Wards of Arusha City
Wards of Arusha Region